Sarria is a municipality in the province of Lugo, northwestern Spain, in the autonomous community of Galicia. Sarria is the most populous town on the French Way in Galicia, with 13,700 inhabitants. It is head of the region and the most popular starting point for the Camino de Santiago; many pilgrims choose Sarria because the distance from this point to Santiago allows them to cover the necessary kilometers to reach the Compostela. King Alfonso IX of León died in Sarria in 1230 while making a pilgrimage to Santiago de Compostela.

Artistic heritage
Sarria's artistic heritage is primarily characterized by churches, which are essential to the Way of St. James. This includes the early-Gothic, 13th-century church, O Salvador, which is located on Rúa Maior. In this town, from its unusual rúa Maior, it is possible to see the only tower that remains of the medieval fortress belonging to the town called Fortress of Sarria.

Around this tower, a fair is held three times a month to showcase the traditional products of the area. 
From its medieval past, Sarria conserves the Convent of A Madalena, currently belonging to the Mercedarian Fathers, founded at the beginning of the 13th century as a pilgrim hospital by Italian monks of the Order of the Blessed Martyrs of Jesus, who were also pilgrims. The present building, which houses a small cloister and a church, is a mixture of different styles of construction ranging from the 15th to the 18th centuries. Today, it is also a private school.

Sarria stands out in the Camino de Santiago for being the population centre with the largest offering of services. It has a strategic point of view of its connections; it is accessible through railway and road, being especially important the 546 road the connects Lugo and Monforte, direction Ponferrada.

Leisure activities 
The township of Sarria offers a number of leisure activities to visitors, such as O Chanto recreational site, on the banks of the river Sarria. There are also options for fishing at several preserves along the river Sarria, hunting, trekking or taking horseback rides.

The village's gastronomy includes dishes like the local stew (cocido), made primarily of pork, octopus, pasty and wild game, partridge, boar and hare. Other local foods include the blood crepes of milk and egg freixos, served with cream or honey.

The economy of this Galician town is based on cattle farming and industry, especially the production of furniture. However, the importance of tourism in Sarria in increasing, mostly due to its cultural heritage, landscapes and food.

The most popular festivities in Sarria are the feast of St. John, which is the patron saint festival, and Corpus Christi, during which a procession takes place. The Noite Meiga (Witch's Night) is held the last Saturday of August.

Gallery

Notable people
 

José Díaz Fuentes (1940–2010), Spanish sculptor

References

See also

Municipalities in the Province of Lugo